Kidaptive is a Silicon Valley-based developer of educational technology.  Kidaptive's core product is an adaptive-learning platform, which powers a variety of learning domains including two Kidaptive-created apps for early learning. Kidaptive was founded by P.J. Gunsagar (co-founder of Prana Studios) and Dylan Arena (Stanford University Learning Scientist). The creative director for Kidaptive's Leo's Pad series is Dan Danko, who has worked on numerous children's television shows such as Rugrats and Fresh Beat Band.

Investors in the startup include Formation 8, Stanford University, Cambridge University, Menlo Investors, Prana Holdings, New Schools Venture Fund, Veddis Ventures, CrunchFund, and VKRM Ventures.

Products 

The company's technology is created with the guidance of professional educators, including two Stanford University Professors of Education, Dan Schwartz and Ed Haertel.

Adaptive Learning Platform (ALP) 
Kidaptive's ALP is a Big Data platform that combines information from multiple learning contexts (digital & physical) to create a psychometric profile of each learner.

Leo’s Pad 

Kidaptive launched its first app, Leo's Pad, in December 2012. The app is designed for preschool-aged children and is organized like a TV series, consisting of multiple chapters or “appisodes.” The series stars Leonardo da Vinci as a child, as well as his young friends Galileo Galilei, Marie Curie, Confucius, Phillis Wheatley, and Teresa Carreño.

The app combines education and entertainment as learners participate in a curriculum that integrates physics, math, logic, letters, and art. The activities also help develop cognitive skills including executive function, working memory, and impulse control.

Learner Mosaic 

Leo's Pad pairs with a companion app called Learner Mosaic, which allows parents to monitor their child's progress, identify areas of cognitive and non-cognitive development that might need more attention, and read research-based tips and recommendations for how to support learning in the real world.

Awards and recognition 

Kidaptive founders Arena and Gunsagar have presented twice (Spring 2012 and Winter 2013) at Stanford's student startup accelerator StartX.

Awards for the Leo's Pad series:
Winner LAUNCH Edu 2013
Winner Startup World San Francisco 2013
Winner Academics' Choice Awards for mind-building excellence 2014

References

External links 
 Kidaptive Official site

Companies established in 2011
Silicon Valley